The name Tino has been used for four tropical cyclones worldwide, three in the Philippines by PAGASA in the Western Pacific Ocean, and one in the South Pacific Ocean.

In the Western Pacific:
 Tropical Depression 24W (2009) (24W, Tino)– short-lived cyclone east of the Philippines.
 Typhoon Wipha (2013) (T1326, 25W, Tino) – caused extensive damage in Japan.
 Tropical Storm Kirogi (2017) (T1725, 31W, Tino) – made landfall in Vietnam

In the South Pacific:
 Cyclone Tino (2020) –  passed near Fiji

Pacific typhoon set index articles